Aelita Vyacheslavovna Yurchenko (born 1 January 1965) is a retired Ukrainian sprinter who specialised in the 400 metres. She represented the Soviet Union and later Ukraine at three outdoor and two indoor World Championships.

Competition record

Personal bests
Outdoor
200 metres – 22.67 (Simferopol 1988)
400 metres – 49.47 (Moscow 1988)
Indoor
400 metres – 51.59 (Seville 1991)

References

All-Athletics profile

1965 births
Living people
People from Mogilev
Ukrainian female sprinters
Soviet female sprinters
World Athletics Championships athletes for the Soviet Union
World Athletics Championships athletes for Ukraine
World Athletics Championships medalists
World Athletics Indoor Championships medalists